Dongheon Lee (이동헌; born December 25, 1993), known professionally as Keith Ape and previously known as Kid Ash, is a South Korean rapper from Seoul. He is a member of a crew called 'The Cohort'. Ape's breakout single "잊지마" ("It G Ma") was released on January 1, 2015, and was ranked by Billboard K-Town at number five on their list of the Best K-Pop Songs of 2015.

Musical style and reception 
Keith Ape has been called the "Korean OG Maco" and noted for an exciting concert performance at 2015's South by Southwest rap showcase, among other performances which included Young Thug, Desiigner, Waka Flocka Flame, XXXTentacion, and more. His concert at SOB's in 2015 was listed as one of The New York Times top 40 picks, "unrestrained mayhem", and "a clear inheritor of Southern rap rowdiness".

Controversy 
On February 4, 2015, he was accused by American rapper OG Maco of cultural appropriation. OG Maco claimed Keith Ape and friends had mocked him by using black stereotypes to sell music in their video of "It G Ma". He also claimed that they had plagiarized the basis for their track from his debut single "U Guessed It". As of August 13, 2015, OG Maco collects royalties from "It G Ma", and has since deleted his tweets regarding his accusations of cultural appropriation. Nonetheless, he declined an invitation by Keith Ape to be part of a later remix rendition of "It G Ma".

Discography

Extended plays

Studio albums

Collaborative albums

References 

South Korean male rappers
1993 births
Living people
Musicians from Seoul
Rappers from Seoul